United States–China security cooperation refers to various projects, combined operations, communications, official dialogues, joint exchanges, and joint exercises, between agencies, groups, and individuals within the government of United States and the People's Republic of China, in a number of areas pertaining to global security, defense policy, and various forms of military and security cooperation.

As the biggest and second-biggest economies in the world, respectively, the United States and China possess a unique role in global society, which has impelled both of them to engineer a number of joint efforts in various policy areas.

Overview
The U.S.–China Strategic and Economic Dialogue is a high-level dialogue for the United States and China to discuss a wide range of regional and global strategic and economic issues between both countries. The establishment of the S&ED was announced on April 1, 2009 by U.S. President Barack Obama and Chinese President Hu Jintao. The upgraded mechanism replaced the former Senior Dialogue and Strategic Economic Dialogue, which started under the George W. Bush administration in 2006.

The format is such that high-level representatives of both countries and their delegations will meet annually at capitals alternating between the two countries.

In 2014, China and the US were among 21 countries who signed an agreement to implement the Code for Unplanned Encounters at Sea. in order to foster improved communications and interactions between warships of different nations who may have encounters on the high seas.

In August 2017, a new agreement was signed by US and Chinese high-ranking officers, to foster a useful strategic communication process between the two militaries.

Specific joint efforts and policy areas

Army
The US Army and People's Liberation Army regularly conduct joint army exercises to practice techniques for disaster rescue efforts, officially referred to as Humanitarian Aid and Disaster Relief (HADR). Starting in 2005, the two countries have conducted the annual Disaster Management Exchange, which consists of a substantive exchange of knowledge and techniques. This exercise has expanded and has been held in a number of different locations throughout the US and China.

In 2010, a Chinese Army delegation visited Fort Leonard Wood in the US, in order to learn about disaster rescue techniques. In 2011, a US Army delegation visited China for a 12-day visit, and toured numerous Chinese facilities. They met with officers of the Engineer Regiment, Chinese International Search and Rescue (CISAR), in western Beijing. They viewed numerous vehicles and facilities to be used for disaster rescue. In 2012, the exchange took place in several cities in China.

In 2013, a field exercise was added to the usual exchange of information, based on feedback stemming from the previous DME session in 2012. That year's conference included representatives from United States Army Pacific, Hawaii Army National Guard and Army Corps of Engineers along with representatives from the Federal Emergency Management Agency.  In 2015, delegations from both countries met at Joint Base Lewis-McChord in Washington State, and exchanged information on various techniques for disaster preparation. This was the first time that Chinese troops have ever entered an American base in the continental USA.

In 2016, the joint exercises were held in China, involving around 200 soldiers from both countries. In 2017, the joint exercises were held in Portland, Oregon. In 2018 the US-China Disaster Management Exchange was held in Nanjing, China. In 2019, the exercises were held at Kilauea Military Camp and Kilauea Military Reservation, in Hawaii.  The official U.S. Army Facebook page for this exercise indicated that Gen. Paul LaCamera, Commanding General, U.S. Army Pacific, had personally met with Maj. Gen. Xu Qiling, Commanding General Eastern Theater Command Army, Peoples Liberation Army.  

At the 2019 exercise, one American officer, U.S. Army Pacific Deputy Commanding General-North, Maj. Gen. Daniel McDaniel, provided a cogent summary of why these exercises are needed: 

 "No one nation can do it all by itself. The best results, we know by experience, are achieved together..... It is not a question of if the U.S and China will be called upon for a disaster response, but when such a request will come. This exchange brings us together and it brings us together to learn how to work together, and with other nations to support such a request."

Navy
In 2012, China was invited to observe the US Navy's annual RIMPAC exercise. In 2014, the People's Liberation Army Navy began to actively participate in this exercise. This continued in 2016. At that exercise, China participated with 5 warships and 1,200 personnel.
 
In 2013, US and Chinese warships conducted joint anti-piracy drills near the Horn of Africa. This included aircraft-landing exercises on each other's ships. In December 2014, the Chinese and US Navies held an anti-piracy exercise in the Gulf of Aden. This included utilization of the procedures dictated by the Code for Unplanned Encounters at Sea, an important international code of procedures for ship encounters.

Coast Guard
Since 1993, the US Coast Guard and the China Coast Guard have assigned detachments of officers to work aboard each other's vessels to assist in cracking down on illegal fisheries. In 2016, the Coast Guard Commandant stated this program was going well, with extensive contacts between the two services.

Enlisted personnel of the China Coast Guard have trained alongside US Coast Guard personnel in search and rescue techniques.

Nuclear security
In July 2017,  scientists from both countries worked together to modify a nuclear reactor in Ghana, in order to reconfigure it to use lower-grade uranium that is not suitable for use in building nuclear weapons. This is part of an ongoing effort by US and China to take similar actions for nuclear facilities around the world. Under the 2015 Iran nuclear deal, U.S. and Chinese scientists are reconfiguring a heavy water reactor in Iran, so that it cannot be used as a significant source of plutonium.

The nucleus of this team effort is the U.S.-China Arms Control Technical Exchange Program (ACE), which was created in 1994 with nuclear scientists from major weapon labs such as Los Alamos National Laboratory, and with China's Academy of Engineering Physics (CAEP) in southwest China.

Cyber-security
In October 2017, the US and China held the first meeting of an official joint effort to be known as Law Enforcement and Cyber Security Dialogue. This effort is intended to allow both countries to work together to address problems with hacking and to improve conditions for global computer security and cyber-security in general.

UN peacekeeping and global security

In September 2015, President Barack Obama hosted the U.S.-China Climate Leaders Summit in Los Angeles, California. During this summit meeting, China agreed to provide 8,000 soldiers for peacekeeping operations, $100 million in funding, and also agreed to train 2,000 foreign soldiers for the African Union stability forces.

See also

 China–United States relations
 Combined operations

General items
Air route authority between the United States and China
Chimerica
Group of Two
Strategic Economic Dialogue
U.S.–China Strategic and Economic Dialogue
Quadrilateral Security Dialogue
Permanent normal trade relations
United States-China Economic and Security Review Commission

Foreign policy issues and concerns 
China as an emerging superpower
China containment policy
China Lobby
Chinese intelligence operations in the United States

History
1996 United States campaign finance controversy
Cox Report
Hainan Island incident
Hu Na incident
Nixon in China
Ping-pong diplomacy
Red Chinese Battle Plan
U.S. immigration policy toward the People's Republic of China
Chinatowns in the United States

References

Further reading

Policy studies
 Building a New Type of U.S.-China Military-to-Military Relationship: Building a New Type of U.S.-China Military-to-Military Relationship, An Interview with Major General Yao Yunzhu.By Kyle Churchman, September 18, 2015.
 Enhancing U.S.-China Military-to-Military Exchanges, Roy D. Kamphausen, September 22, 2015.

United States
 The Army in Multinational Relations, U.S. Department of the Army official manual, April 2014. 
 Multinational Operations, Official guidebook, Defense Technical Information Center, U.S. Department of Defense, July 16, 2013.
 Personnel Support to Joint Operations, U.S. Army Strategic Studies Institute, October 16, 2006.
 Joint Operating Environment, U.S. Joint Forces Command (USJFCOM), December 2007. 
 The 5 Most Powerful Navies on the Planet,  by Kyle Mizokami, Oct 20, 2017.

China
 ANNUAL REPORT TO CONGRESS: Military and Security Developments Involving the People's Republic of China 2017. US Secretary of Defense. 
People's Liberation Army Reforms and Their Ramifications, by Cristina L. Garafola.
 Analysis: Radical revamp for People's Liberation Army, by Gordon Arthur, 24 November 2016.
 Expect a shakeup of China's military elite at the 19th Party Congress, BY EDITOR ON OCTOBER 18, 2017.
Chinese Strategy and Military Power in 2014: Chinese, Japanese, Korean, Taiwanese and US Assessments, By Anthony H. Cordesman.
 The Diversified Employment of China's Armed Forces, Information Office of the State Council, The People's Republic of China,　　April 2013, Beijing.
 Chinese Strategy and Military Modernization in 2015: A Comparative Analysis, By Anthony H. Cordesman, Steven Colley.
 8 things to know about China's biggest army training base. Zhurihe base in Inner Mongolia offers realistic battle conditions in a variety of terrains Monday, 24 July 2017.
 TEN REASONS WHY CHINA WILL HAVE TROUBLE FIGHTING A MODERN WAR, DENNIS J. BLASKO, FEBRUARY 18, 2015
PLA organizes free air-combat confrontation drill, Source: China Military Online)   2014-09-15
As overseas ambitions expand, China plans 400 per cent increase to marine corps numbers, sources say, March 13, 2017.
Field Guide: The Culture of the Chinese People's Liberation Army, Alison A. Kaufman, Peter W. Mackenzie, CNA CHINA'T+*STUDIES

News Articles

General articles and analysis
 China Defense Blog
 New Law Allows PLA to Undertake Counterterror Missions Overseas, Feb 2017.
 Dunford Arrives in China DoD News, Aug. 14, 2017.
 Pentagon's top general signs a new deal with China as Trump signals an easing of tension with North Korea, By Dan Lamothe August 16
 Top US general: China will be 'greatest threat' to US by 2025, By Ryan Browne, Wed September 27, 2017.
 US, China military chiefs reach deal to reduce 'risk of miscalculation', By James Griffiths, CNN, Wed August 16, 2017.
 Here's What a Top General Thinks Is the Next Big Threat to the U.S., Joseph Hincks, Sep 27, 2017.
 Department of Defense Press Briefing on U.S. Africa Command by General Thomas D. Waldhauser, commander, U.S. Africa Command, Press Operations, General Thomas D. Waldhauser, March 24, 2017.
Can the U.S. and China Get Along in Africa? Top Commander Urges Military Cooperation After Beijing Opens Base in Djibouti, By Conor Gaffey, 9/14/17.

Specific meetings and joint efforts
 By sending general to China, US shows off military ties. Dunford's East Asia trip bolsters efforts to counter North Korea threat, by OKI NAGAI and TSUYOSHI NAGASAWA, Nikkei staff writers, August 19, 2017.
 Xi stresses cooperation in talks with US military chief. Washington, Beijing set up new military communication mechanism, by OKI NAGAI, Nikkei, August 18, 2017.
 CFE-DM hosts PLA commander, November 2, 2016.
 China, US military medical ships exchange visit, 2014-07-22.
 Readout of Deputy Secretary of Defense Bob Work's Meeting with Lt. Gen. Wang Guanzhong, Deputy Chief of the General Staff, People's Liberation Army US Defense Dept, Oct. 17, 2014. 
 Dunford Stresses Diplomacy, Sanctions for North Korea in Talks With Chinese By Jim Garamone DoD News, Defense Media Activity SHENYANG, China, Aug. 16, 2017.

China–United States military relations
International security